Shri Nand Kishore Yadav a politician from Samajwadi Party was a Member of the Parliament of India representing Uttar Pradesh in the Rajya Sabha, the upper house of the Indian Parliament for a term serving 2004–2010. He is the son of former Rajya Sabha MP and founding member of Samajwadi party Late Ish Dutt Yadav. He belongs to Azamgarh district in Uttar Pradesh.

External links
 Profile on Rajya Sabha website
 http://myneta.info/rajsab09sec/candidate.php?candidate_id=234

Samajwadi Party politicians
Rajya Sabha members from Uttar Pradesh
Living people
Place of birth missing (living people)
Year of birth missing (living people)
Samajwadi Party politicians from Uttar Pradesh